The Silver Bear for Best Director is an award presented annually at the Berlin International Film Festival since 1956. It is given for the best achievement in directing and is chosen by the International Jury from the films in the Competition slate at the festival.

At the 6th Berlin International Film Festival held in 1956, Robert Aldrich was the first winner of this award for his work on Autumn Leaves, and Philippe Garrel is the most recent winner in this category for his work on The Plough at the 73rd Berlin International Film Festival in 2023.

History
The award was first presented in 1956. The prize was not awarded on five occasions (1969, 1971, 1973–74, and 1981). In 1970, no awards were given as the festival was called off mid-way due to the controversy over official selection film, o.k. by Michael Verhoeven, which led to the resignation of the international jury. Mario Monicelli has received the most awards in this category, with three. Satyajit Ray is the only director to win the award in consecutive years, for Mahanagar (1964) and Charulata (1965). One directing team has shared the award: Michael Winterbottom and Mat Whitecross for The Road to Guantánamo (2006). Astrid Henning-Jensen was the first woman to have won the award, for 1979's Winterborn.

Winners

Multiple winners

The following individuals received two or more Best Director awards:

See also
 Cannes Film Festival Award for Best Director
 Silver Lion

External links

 Berlinale website

References

Director
 
Silver Bear